This is a list of diplomatic missions and trade organizations in Chicago. Many governments and organizations have established diplomatic and trade representation in Chicago, Illinois.

Consulates general and honorary consulates
Consulates-General are staffed by career consulate foreign nationals, usually with full diplomatic protection. Honorary consuls are accredited US citizens or residents who have official standing but are usually part-time  The United States Department of State's Chicago regional office serves these missions.

Non-sovereign missions 
Diplomatic missions for territories that do not have full sovereign status are also present in Chicago.

Chambers of commerce

Chicagoland Chamber of Commerce - 
African American Chamber of Commerce of Aurora
America-Israel Chamber of Commerce Chicago - 
American-Russian Chamber of Commerce & Industry - 
American Southeast Europe Chamber of Commerce - 
American-Ukrainian Chamber of Commerce & Industry - 
Argentine-American Midwest Chamber of Commerce - 
Australian New Zealand American Chamber of Commerce—Midwest - 
Austrian Trade Commission - 
Basque Trade Commission
British-American Business Council—Chicago - 
Bronzeville Black Chamber of Commerce
Canada-US Business Council - 
Chicago Chinatown Chamber of Commerce - 
Chicago Turkish American Chamber of Commerce - 
Continental Africa Chamber of Commerce USA - 
Dutch Chicago Business Exchange of the Netherland-America Foundation - 
French American Chamber of Commerce Chicago Chapter - 
German American Chamber of Commerce of the Midwest - 
Greater O'Hare Association - 
Illinois Hispanic Chamber of Commerce - 
Italian American Chamber of Commerce Midwest - 
Japan Chamber of Commerce - 
Korean American Chamber of Commerce - 
Midwest Danish American Chamber of Commerce - 
Mongolian National Chamber of Commerce and Industry - 
Norwegian American Chamber of Commerce, Inc., - 
Philippine-American Chamber of Commerce of Greater Chicago - 
Polish American Chamber of Commerce - 
Puerto Rican Chamber of Commerce of Illinois - 
Serbian-American Chamber of Commerce - 
Southland Chamber of Commerce - 
Swedish American Chamber of Commerce - 
Turkish-American Chamber of Commerce and Industry Midwest - 
United States of America-China Chamber of Commerce - 
U.S. India Chamber of Commerce Midwest  - 
U.S. Mexico Chamber of Commerce Mid-America Chapter - 
U.S. Pan-Asian Chamber of Commerce Midwest Chapter - 
U.S.-Qatar Business Council - 
The Zhejiang Chamber of Commerce in USA (ZCCU) -

Trade organizations

Advantage West Midlands and East Midlands Development Agency - 
American Association of Translators
American Egyptian Cooperation Foundation
Arab-American Business and Professional Association - 
Asian American Alliance
Asian American Small Business Association of Chicago
Association of Chinese Scientists & Engineers USA (ACSE) - 
Belgian Business Club of Chicago
British-American Business Council Chicago - 
Canada-US Business Council - 
Chicago Council on Global Affairs - 
Chicago International Dispute Resolution Association (CIDRA)
Chicago/Ireland Business Development Association
Chicago Sister Cities International Program
Conference Board Inc.
CzechTrade 
Dutch Chicago Business Exchange -   
Embassy of France Economic Mission
Executives' Club of Chicago
Flanders Investment and Trade - 
Food Exporters Association of the Midwest USA - 
FrankfurtRhineMain Corp. - 
Germany Trade & Invest
Hispanic American Construction Industry Association - 
IDA Ireland
Illinois China Coalition
Indonesian Trade Promotion Center
International Women Associates, Inc.
Invest in France Agency North America - 
Invest Victoria
Invest in Northern France
Italian Trade Agency 
Japan External Trade Organization (JETRO) -  
Korean American Merchants Association of Chicago - 
Latino Technology Association
Lithuanian Business Council - 
Lithuanian Trade Office, Inc. - 
Malaysian Industrial Development
National Association of Asian-American Professionals – Chicago - 
Netherlands Foreign Investment Agency - 
New Chicago Japanese American Association
The North of England
North American Representative Office of Shenzhen
NRW INVEST 
Office of Trade and Investment - 
Overseas Sales and Marketing Association
Québec Delegation, Chicago
Scottish Development International USA – Central Region
Shenyang Government U.S. Economy and Trade Office
Singapore Economic Development Board
Small Business Corporation USA (Korea)
SODEVAL – Valais Economic Dev. Corp.
South African American Business Club
Swedish Trade Council (Business Sweden Chicago)
Swiss Business Hub USA
Swiss-American Business Council - 
Taipei Economic & Cultural Office in Chicago - 
TEDA America Chicago Office  (Tianjin China Economic Development Area)
U.S. Export Assistance Center - 
Walloon Export and Foreign Investment Agency -

References

Chicago-related lists